Navtej Bharati is one of the most well-known Punjabi poets living in Canada. Born and brought up in Rode village near Moga in Punjab, India, he moved to Canada in 1960s. He now lives in London, Ontario with his wife Surinder Kaur. They have two children, a son Subodh and daughter Sumeet.

Bharati has published books in Punjabi and English. He was the publisher of Third Eye Press, whose books covered many genres.

His book Leela(ਲੀਲਾ), co-authored with his brother Ajmer Rode is more than 1000 pages long and is considered one of the most important Punjabi poetry works of the twentieth century.

In 2012 he wrote a long poem Lali(ਲਾਲੀ), based on the iconic character of Prof Hardiljeet Singh who taught in Punjabi University, Patiala and was known as 'Lali'. The book was also a tribute to the legendary Bhootwara (ghost house) in Patiala that was a centre of intellectual activities involving Lali among others with Sutinder Singh Noor, Gurbhagat Singh, Harinder Singh Mehboob, Prem Pali, Amarjit Sathi, Surjit Lee and Kulwant Grewal besides Bharati.

Bharati's English-language poetry book, Endless Eye, was published by the Canadian Poetry Association.

While living in India, Bharati was a three-time winner (1959, 1960, 1961) of the Best Poet of the State award, given by the Punjab Languages Department.  In 2003 he was given the Best Overseas Author Award by the Languages Department.  In 2010 Navtej Bharati received Anād Kāv Sanmān carrying a citation and cash prize of Rs 2.5 lakh.

Bibliography

Poetry
Simbal De Phul - 1968
Leela - 1999, 2019 (with Ajmer Rode)
Endless Eye - 2002
Lali - 2012
Othon trek - 2016, 2019

Prose
Puth Sidh - 2019

References

External links
Poemhunter

20th-century Canadian poets
Canadian male poets
21st-century Canadian poets
Canadian writers of Asian descent
Canadian people of Indian descent
Living people
Writers from London, Ontario
20th-century Canadian male writers
21st-century Canadian male writers
1938 births